{{Automatic taxobox
| name = Tent-making bats
| image = Common tent-making bats.JPG
| image_caption = Tent-making bat (Uroderma bilobatum)
| taxon = Uroderma
| authority = Peters, 1865
| type_species = Phyllostoma personatum| type_species_authority = Peters, 1865
}}Uroderma is a genus of Central and South American phyllostomid bats.

Species
Baker's tent-making bat, Uroderma bakeriTent-making bat, Uroderma bilobatumBrown tent-making bat, Uroderma magnirostrum''

References

Phyllostomidae
Bat genera
Taxa named by Wilhelm Peters